Kenya (KEN) has competed at every edition of the African Games. Since its inauguration in 1965, Kenyan athletes have won a total of 33 medals. Kenya has hosted the games once in 1987, with the events taking place in the Moi International Sports Centre in Nairobi.

Medal tables

Medals by Games

Below is a table representing all Kenyan medals around the Games.

See also 
 Kenya at the Olympics
 Kenya at the Paralympics
 Sports in Kenya

References

External links 
 All-Africa Games index - todor66.com